The Women's Australian Hockey League is highest level field hockey tournament for women in Australia. Until 2016, the annually contested tournament comprised teams from the eight states and territories of Australia.

The 2016 edition of the tournament, held in Perth, Western Australia, included two international teams. Teams from Malaysia and New Zealand competed in the 2016 edition.

The NSW Arrows are the most recent champions, defeating the QLD Scorchers 7–6 in gold medal match of the 2018 AHL.

Teams
Domestic teams

  Canberra Strikers
  NSW Arrows
  NT Pearls
  QLD Scorchers
  SA Suns
  Tassie Van Demons
  VIC Vipers
  WA Diamonds

International teams
  IND Development
  MAS Tigress
  NZL Futures

Results

Summaries
Note: The following summaries comprise results from 2002 onwards, while the tournament was founded in 1993.

Successful teams
Note: The following table comprises results from 2002 onwards, while the tournament was founded in 1993.

Team appearances

Statistics

References

 
Australia
Hockey
 
1993 establishments in Australia
Sports leagues established in 1993
Field hockey leagues in Australia